The Ellis River is a river of the northwestern South Island of New Zealand. It arises near Mount Arthur in the Wharepapa / Arthur Range and flows south-east within Kahurangi National Park.  It is a tributary of the Baton River.

See also
List of rivers of New Zealand

References

Land Information New Zealand - Search for Place Names

Rivers of the Tasman District
Kahurangi National Park
Rivers of New Zealand